The 1960 Daytona 500 was a NASCAR Grand National Series stock car race that was held on February 14, 1960, at Daytona International Speedway in Daytona Beach, Florida, United States. It was the 5th race of the 1960 season, and was won by Junior Johnson in a 1959 Chevrolet.

Summary
The 200 lap race started with Cotton Owens on the pole and Jack Smith joining him on the front row.  Junior Johnson won the four hour race driving a 59 Chevy owned by John Masoni. A crowd of 38,775 watched as Johnson drove the number 27 to victory after starting in the 9th position.

Bud Burdick, Pappy Crane, Dick Foley, Dick Freeman, Tommy Herbert, Dave Hirschfield, Bob Kosiski, Shep Langdon and Bill Lutz would retire from NASCAR after this event.

Pre-race 
In late January 1960, the CBS network sent anchorman Bud Palmer and 50 other employees to Daytona to cover the events in the first-ever televised coverage of a NASCAR event. CBS announced that their CBS Sports Spectacular show would televise a couple compact car races and the Grand National Pole Position races at Daytona on January 31. On February 13 a Modified-Sportsman race took place. NASCAR officials lined up 73 cars to take the green flag. Less than a minute and a half after the green flag flew, mayhem ensued when Dick Foley's Chevy got out of shape. While Foley was able to gather control of his car, and finish the race in tenth place, 37 other vehicles behind him crashed while attempting to avoid the confusion. Twelve cars flipped, and a total of 24 drivers were unable to continue the race. Five ambulances responded to transport 8 drivers to local hospitals. Four drivers were released that day, and four drivers were held overnight. Notable drivers Ralph Earnhardt, Wendell Scott, and Speedy Thompson were among those forced out of the race. Driver Speedy Thompson was quoted as saying  It took cleaning crews and tow trucks only 39 minutes to clear the track for the restart. Marion "Bubba" Farr went on to win the record setting crash fest.

Qualifying races 
Fireball Roberts won the first  qualifying race, and Jack Smith won the second on the  track. Roberts grabbed his victory on the paved oval completing the 40 laps in 45 minutes, with two cautions in a 1960 Pontiac. Owens finished second, and Fred Lorenzen rounded out the top 3 with 2 cautions for 5 laps. The first caution came on lap 1 when Gene White, Dave Hirschfield, and Tommy Irwin all got together coming out of turn two. Irwin and his Ford Thunderbird took a trip into lake Lloyd located in the infield, and Irwin had to swim to safety as the car was nearly submerged. By the time the yellow flag had been displayed, Roberts had already advanced to the front of the pack, and would never relinquish the lead. The win would give Roberts his 22nd NASCAR victory.    
There were 2 cautions; and Bobby Johns finished second with Jim Reed grabbing the third spot. The first single lap caution came when John Rosteck spun on lap six, and the second caution, also a one lap slow down, came when Johnny Dodd Jr. crashed into the wall on lap 15. The dubious distinction of bringing out the first ever black flag fell to Herman "Turtle" Beam on lap 8 when officials noticed that Beam was running without his safety helmet, which he had forgotten on the starting grid. Smith set a record for the time by winning with the combination of his speed, and the minimal caution laps. The win was Smith's second of the year, and 12,500 people looked on as he and Roberts grabbed the two top spots in the qualifying races.

Race 
The high winds, combined with the high speeds resulted in 32 laps being run under caution, and multiple crashes. Tommy Herbert suffered a broken arm and severe eye injury when his T-bird flipped and blew apart when he crashed into the wall on the back straightaway on lap 118. The engine went one direction, the car another, and the front end assembly took flight up to 75 feet in the air. Driving through the wreckage, Pappy Crane spun, then rolled his Chevy, but was not hurt. Also included in the attrition was George Green whose car burst into flame forcing him to leap from the car to safety, and Tom Pistone who lost control with 2 laps remaining and hit the turn 4 wall. 
Junior Johnson took the lead with nine laps remaining when Bobby Johns spun, and Johnson went on to win the race. Johns had grabbed the lead on lap 172, but the winds pulled his back window out, and he lost control.  The win was Johnson's first victory of the season.

Legacy 
There were so many cars destroyed or damaged during the 500 that NASCAR officials felt compelled to cancel a couple races that were scheduled for the following weekend.  Palmetto Speedway and Hollywood Speedway both lost their scheduled  events due to the carnage at Daytona.

Race winner Junior Johnson went on to achieve multiple accolades in the following years; including being inducted into the International Motorsports Hall of Fame in 1990 and being selected as one of NASCAR's 50 Greatest Drivers in 1998. On February 4, 2010, NASCAR announced that Johnson would be Grand Marshal for the 50th anniversary of his 1960 victory.

Part of Johnson's duties as Grand Marshal would be to utter the immortal words "Gentleman, start your engines" at the 52nd running of the Daytona 500 on February 14, 2010.

Official results

References 

Daytona 500
Daytona 500
NASCAR races at Daytona International Speedway
Daytona 500